The Government of the 31st Dáil or the 29th Government of Ireland (9 March 2011 – 6 May 2016) was the government of Ireland which was formed following the 2011 general election to Dáil Éireann on 25 February 2011. It was a coalition government of Fine Gael and the Labour Party led by Enda Kenny as Taoiseach. From 2011 to 2014, Labour Party leader Eamon Gilmore served as Tánaiste, and from 2014 to 2016, the new Labour leader Joan Burton served as Tánaiste.

The 29th Government lasted  days from its appointment until its resignation, and continued to carry out its duties for a further 57 days until the appointment of the successor government, giving a total of  days in office.

29th Government of Ireland

Nomination of Taoiseach
The 31st Dáil first met on 9 March 2011. In the debate on the nomination of Taoisech, only Fine Gael leader Enda Kenny was proposed. This proposal was carried with 117 votes in favour and 27 votes against, the greatest number of votes cast in the Dáil in favour of the nomination of a candidate for Taoiseach. Kenny was appointed as Taoiseach by president Mary McAleese.

Members of the Government
After his appointment by the president, Enda Kenny proposed the members of the government and they were approved by the Dáil.

Changes to departments

Attorney General
On 9 March 2011, Máire Whelan SC was appointed as Attorney General by the president on the nomination of the Taoiseach.

Ministers of State
On 9 March 2011, Paul Kehoe and Willie Penrose were appointed by the government on the nomination of the Taoiseach as Ministers of State who would attend cabinet without a vote. On 10 March 2011, the government on the nomination of the Taoiseach appointed 13 further Ministers of State.

Economic Management Council
The Economic Management Council was a cabinet subcommittee of senior ministers formed to co-ordinate the response to the Irish financial crisis and the government's dealings with the troika of the European Commission, the European Central Bank and the International Monetary Fund. Its members were the Taoiseach, the Tánaiste, the Minister for Finance, and the Minister for Public Expenditure and Reform. It was supported by the Department of the Taoiseach, led by Dermot McCarthy. Brigid Laffan compared it to a war cabinet. Opposition parties suggested the Council represented a dangerous concentration of power.

Following the formation of a government in 2016, Shane Ross, an incoming member of the new 30th Government of Ireland, confirmed in the Dáil that the subcommittee would not form part of the new government. Ross told the Dáil on 6 May 2016: "I had a conversation last night with the Taoiseach. I was talking to him about Dáil reform and I asked him about an issue – a last point I had forgotten to ask about earlier – which was the abolition of the Economic Management Council. I thought it was going to be like one of these thorny topics which we had been through over the last few weeks. He told me okay, it is gone, that it had been needed for a particular time and it is not needed any more and I was to consider it gone. To me that was very encouraging because it meant that one of those obstacles to Dáil reform, one of those rather secretive bodies that had dictated to the Cabinet and to the Dáil the agenda of what came out to the country, was now a thing of the past."

Budgets
The Minister for Finance, Michael Noonan, and the Minister for Public Expenditure and Reform, Brendan Howlin, delivered the following budgets:
 2012 budget, on 5 and 6 December 2011
 2013 budget, on 5 December 2012
 2014 budget, on 15 October 2013
 2015 budget, on 14 October 2014
 2016 budget, on 13 October 2015

Confidence in the government
On 18 September 2012, Fianna Fáil TD Billy Kelleher proposed a motion of no confidence in the Minister for Health, James Reilly. The debate was noted for the contribution on the second day of debate of Róisín Shortall, a Minister of State at the Department of Health, who voted with the government, but did not mention the minister. Following amendment, this was debated a motion commending the work of the minister, and was approved by a vote of 99 to 50. Those voting against the government included Tommy Broughan and Patrick Nulty, who had been elected as Labour Party TDs, and Denis Naughten, who had been elected as a Fine Gael TD and had left in protest at closure of services at the Roscommon University Hospital. Shortall resigned as a junior minister and from the Labour Parliamentary Party the following week.

On 11 December 2012, Sinn Féin TD Pearse Doherty proposed a motion of no confidence in the government, stating that it had "failed to fulfil its obligations to make political decisions and choices which benefit the citizens of this State". Brendan Howlin, the Minister for Public Expenditure and Reform, proposed an amendment such that the motion read, "That Dáil Éireann has confidence in the Government as it deals with the current economic crisis in as fair a manner as possible, while prioritising economic recovery and job creation". Debate continued the following day. The amended motion was carried by a vote of 88 to 51. Those voting against the government included Róisín Shortall.

On 1 April 2014, Fiann Fáil TD Niall Collins proposed a motion of no confidence in the Minister for Justice and Equality, Alan Shatter. Following amendment, this was debated a motion commending the work of the minister. Debate continued on 2 April, and the amended motion was carried by a vote of 95 to 51. This was just over a month before Shatter resigned on the submission of the Guerin Report to the Taoiseach.

On 9 December 2014, the Dáil debated a motion of confidence in the Taoiseach and in the government. This motion was proposed by Taoiseach Enda Kenny in response to a motion of no confidence proposed by Sinn Féin, which referred to "the widespread public opposition to domestic water charges and to Irish Water". The vote of confidence was carried by a vote of 86 to 55. Those voting against included Lucinda Creighton, Peter Mathews and Billy Timmins, who had been elected as Fine Gael TDs.

Dissolution and resignation
On 3 February 2016, Taoiseach Enda Kenny sought a dissolution of the Dáil which was granted by the president, with the new Dáil to convene on 10 March. The general election took place on 26 February.

The 32nd Dáil first met on 10 March 2016. Enda Kenny, Fianna Fáil leader Micheál Martin, Sinn Féin leader Gerry Adams, and Richard Boyd Barrett of the Anti-Austerity Alliance–People Before Profit were each proposed for nomination as Taoiseach. None of the four motions were successful. Kenny announced that he would resign as Taoiseach but that under the provisions of Article 28.11 of the Constitution, the government would continue to carry out their duties until their successors were appointed. Kenny continued in this capacity until 6 May 2016, when he was again nominated for the appointment by the president to the position of Taoiseach and formed the 30th Government of Ireland.

See also
Politics of the Republic of Ireland

References

2011 establishments in Ireland
2016 disestablishments in Ireland
31st Dáil
Cabinets established in 2011
Cabinets disestablished in 2016
Coalition governments of Ireland
Governments of Ireland